Acanthocotyle elegans is a species of monogenean fish skin parasites.

References 

Gyrodactylidea
Animals described in 1890